Summoner is an action role-playing game developed by Volition and published by THQ. It was released as a launch title for the PlayStation 2 in 2000, and was subsequently ported to Microsoft Windows and Mac OS the following year. In the game, the player plays the role of Joseph and can assemble a team of compatriots and summon powerful monsters. The game has a world map, involved storyline, and unique hybrid combat system involving real-time and turn-based mechanisms.

A sequel, Summoner 2, was released in 2002. After the bankruptcy of publisher THQ in December 2012, the Summoner franchise was acquired by Nordic Games, who have since published Summoner on GOG.com (February 25, 2014) and on Steam Digital Distribution platform (March 12, 2014).

Plot

The player takes on the role of Joseph and his party. Joseph is an ordinary peasant farmer who is also born a Summoner who can control the rings of Summoning. Joseph and his companions travel throughout the land to acquire the rings to protect the realm of Medeva from attacks by the tyrannical Emperor Murod of Orenia, who is determined to destroy the Summoner and prevent a prophecy that foretells the end of the Emperor's reign by his hands. The characters must also simultaneously attempt to restore the power of the air god, Urath, and foil the depravations of the disciples of his fire and death goddess nemesis, Laharah.

Gameplay
In addition to the main storyline, there are over twenty side quests that may be completed. Summoner's combat system is a hybrid system incorporating real-time and turn-based combat, with characters essentially "taking turns" to attack during real-time gameplay. Included within this system is a unique "Chain attack" mechanic, in which players can extend their "turn" by performing special melee attacks at the appropriate time. If done correctly, players can "chain" these special attacks into long sequences, inflicting far greater amounts of damage than they might otherwise have. These special attacks can also have special effects such as inflicting status effects, damaging an enemy's action points or inflicting more health damage than normal. Characters can also acquire and use a variety of special abilities and spells, expending "action points" in order to use these abilities. The game's Summoning mechanic allows the player to conjure monsters that will serve as additional party members, allowing the player to have a 5-character party instead of a 4-character party. These monsters have their own spells and abilities that they bring into combat, but will go rogue and attack the player's party if Joseph is defeated in combat.

Music
Scott Lee was the main composer and senior sound designer of Summoner and did most of the game music with Dan Wentz helping on the soundtrack towards the end of development near gold master. Wally Shaw did sound design and some editing of music towards the middle of development. After interplay went bankrupt, Lee provided the first tech demonstration for THQ. During this time Lee and Wentz also worked on the early Descent 4 trailer music, which later rebranded into Red Faction for legal reasons and FreeSpace 2.

Reception

The PC version received "generally favorable reviews", while the PlayStation 2 version received "average" reviews, according to the review aggregation website Metacritic. Blake Fischer of NextGen said that the problem of the latter version "is that it was clearly shoved out the door prematurely, and doing so has all but killed this promising RPG."

The PlayStation 2 version won GameSpots award for "Best Game Story" among console games in 2000. The PC version was later nominated for the website's 2001 "Best Single-Player Role-Playing Game" and "Best Story" prize among PC games, but lost to Wizardry 8 and Anachronox respectively. The former console version also won the awards for Role-Playing Game of 2000 and Storyline of 2000 at IGNs Best of 2000 Awards.

Sequel

A sequel, Summoner 2, was released in 2002.

On December 19, 2012, THQ filed for Chapter 11 Bankruptcy and its properties were auctioned off in individual lots. The Summoner franchise, among other THQ properties including Darksiders and Red Faction, was sold to Nordic Games. Nordic Games have subsequently re-branded and published Summoner to the Steam Digital Distribution Platform.

References

External links
 Official website via Internet Archive
 

2000 video games
Action role-playing video games
Fantasy video games
Classic Mac OS games
PlayStation 2 games
THQ games
Embracer Group franchises
Windows games
Multiplayer and single-player video games
Video games developed in the United States